Galo Blanco (born 8 October 1976) is a retired professional tennis player from Oviedo, Spain. After many years as a professional tennis coach Blanco joined the Davis Cup steering committee in 2018.

Tennis career
Most of Blanco's early professional tour appearances were earned by qualifying for tournaments. He would do so by winning the qualifier's rounds that are usually played before the tournaments themselves, to fill one last tournament spot. It was that way that he was able to participate at the Fairmonts tournament in Scottsdale, Arizona, U.S. in 1996, for example.

Blanco eventually began to be invited to tournaments, and his name has gained reasonable importance in the men's professional circuit. He came closest to winning a Grand Slam title in 1997, reaching the quarterfinals of the French Open by defeating Neville Godwin, Magnus Gustafsson, Chris Woodruff and Petr Korda before losing to Pat Rafter. He won his only title in 1999 San Marino GO&FUN Open to his countryman Albert Portas and reached the final (2001 Mexican Open) and the semifinals in 2000 Majorca Open losing to eventual champion Marat Safin.

Blanco had two high-profile wins in majors, beating former 2-time US Open Champion, Patrick Rafter, in the first round of the 2000 US Open, and in beating Pete Sampras in the second round of the 2001 French Open.

Blanco lost in the second round of the 2004 Australian Open. He announced his retirement after the 2006 Torneo Godó.

Coaching career
Blanco is a prominent tennis coach. He has previously coached the rising Canadian star Milos Raonic. This partnership ended in May 2013. He coached Canadian Filip Peliwo. He coached Karen Khachanov until November 2017. He coached Dominic Thiem from December 2017 until November 2018.

Life after tennis
Since the beginning of 2019 Blanco has been working on the new format Davis Cup event.
In June 2021, Kosmos announced the launch of an athlete management agency to be headed up by Blanco.

ATP career finals

Singles: 2 (1 title, 1 runner-up)

ATP Challenger and ITF Futures finals

Singles: 9 (4–5)

Performance timelines

Singles

Wins over top 10 ranked players

Wins over Top 10s per season

Notes

References

External links
 
 Galo Blanco at the Association of Tennis Professionals Coach profile
 

1976 births
Living people
Sportspeople from Oviedo
Spanish male tennis players
Spanish tennis coaches
Tennis players from Asturias